The Red Covered Bridge is a wooden, covered bridge that runs over Big Bureau Creek north of Princeton in Dover Township, Bureau County, Illinois.  It was originally built in 1863, at a cost of $3,148.57.  The  span is one of ten remaining covered bridges in Illinois, and it is still open to traffic, though now covered with CCTV cameras. It was once part of the Peoria-Galena Trail.

The bridge was added to the U.S. National Register of Historic Places on April 23, 1975.

See also
List of covered bridges in Illinois

References

External links
 Bridgehunter.com data page

Bridges completed in 1863
1860s architecture in the United States
Covered bridges on the National Register of Historic Places in Illinois
Wooden bridges in Illinois
National Register of Historic Places in Bureau County, Illinois
Transportation buildings and structures in Bureau County, Illinois
Tourist attractions in Bureau County, Illinois
Road bridges in Illinois
Road bridges on the National Register of Historic Places in Indiana